Live Phish Vol. 20 was recorded live at the Providence Civic Center in Providence, Rhode Island, on December 29, 1994.

This concert is best known for its experimental, 35-minute version of "David Bowie," widely considered one of the greatest Phish jams of all time. The band also strips down to acoustic instruments (banjo, acoustic guitar, stand-up bass, washboard) for the bluegrass standard "My Long Journey Home." 

The album marked the first time that the song "I Didn't Know" had been issued on an officially released Phish recording.

This show was the second show in a four night stand that would see Phish sell out Madison Square Garden the next night and the Boston Garden two days later on New Year's Eve.

Track listing

Disc one
Set one:
"Runaway Jim" (Abrahams, Anastasio) - 9:49
"Foam" (Anastasio) - 9:51
"If I Could" (Anastasio) - 7:20
"Split Open and Melt" (Anastasio) - 11:10
"The Horse" (Anastasio, Marshall) - 1:32
"Silent in the Morning" (Anastasio, Marshall) - 5:19
"Uncle Pen" (Monroe) - 4:10
"I Didn't Know" (Wright) - 3:46
"Possum" (Holdsworth) - 11:59
Set two:
"Guyute" (Anastasio, Marshall) - 10:56

Disc two
Set two, continued:
"David Bowie" (Anastasio) - 35:41
"Halley's Comet" (Wright) - 5:14
"The Lizards" (Anastasio) - 10:32
"Cracklin' Rosie" (Diamond) - 5:48
"Good Times Bad Times" (Bonham, Jones, Page, Plant) - 6:08
Encore:
"My Long Journey Home" (Traditional) - 3:20
"Sleeping Monkey" (Anastasio, Marshall) - 6:19

Personnel
Trey Anastasio - guitars, lead vocals, drums on "Cracklin' Rosie", acoustic guitar on "My Long Journey Home"
Page McConnell - piano, organ, backing vocals, lead vocals on "Silent in the Morning", upright bass on "My Long Journey Home"
Mike Gordon - bass, backing vocals, lead vocals on "Uncle Pen", "Possum" and "My Long Journey Home", banjo on "My Long Journey Home"
Jon Fishman - drums, backing vocals, lead vocals on "Cracklin' Rosie", washboard on "My Long Journey Home"

20
2003 live albums
Elektra Records live albums